The 1930 UCI Road World Championships took place in Liège, Belgium.

Events Summary

References

 
UCI Road World Championships by year
W
R
R